Ishbuldino (İşbuldı) is a rural locality (a village) in Khalilovsky Selsoviet, Abzelilovsky District, Bashkortostan, Russia. The population was 539 as of 2010. There are 6 streets.

Geography 
Ishbuldino is located 39 km south of Askarovo (the district's administrative centre) by road. Khalilovo is the nearest rural locality.

References 

Rural localities in Abzelilovsky District